Sous-lieutenant Nicolas Léonard Sadi Carnot (1 June 1796 – 24 August 1832) was a French mechanical engineer in the French Army, military scientist and physicist, and often described as the "father of thermodynamics". He published only one book, the Reflections on the Motive Power of Fire (Paris, 1824), in which he expressed the first successful theory of the maximum efficiency of heat engines and laid the foundations of the new discipline: thermodynamics. Carnot's work attracted little attention during his lifetime, but it was later used by Rudolf Clausius and Lord Kelvin to formalize the second law of thermodynamics and define the concept of entropy. Based on purely technical concerns, such as improving the performance of the steam engine, Sadi Carnot's intellect laid the groundwork for modern science technological designs, such as the automobile or jet engine.

His father Lazare Carnot was an eminent mathematician, military engineer, and leader of the French Revolutionary Army.

Life
Nicolas Léonard Sadi Carnot was born in Paris at the Palais du Petit-Luxembourg into a family that was distinguished in both science and politics.  He was the first son of Lazare Carnot,  who chose his son's third given name Sadi (by which he would always be known) after the Persian poet Sadi of Shiraz.  Sadi was the elder brother of statesman Hippolyte Carnot and the uncle of Marie François Sadi Carnot, who would serve as President of France from 1887 to 1894.

His father Lazare Carnot knowing his son's potential, sent him to Lycée Charlemagne in Paris to prepare him for the examinations to École polytechnique. In 1811, at the age of 16, the minimum age possible, Sadi Carnot became a cadet in the École Polytechnique in Paris, where his classmates included Michel Chasles and Gaspard-Gustave Coriolis.  The École Polytechnique was intended to train engineers for military service, but its professors included such eminent scientists as André-Marie Ampère, François Arago, Joseph Louis Gay-Lussac, Louis Jacques Thénard, Jean Nicolas Pierre Hachette, Jean-Henri Hassenfratz, Antoine André Louis Reynaud, and Siméon Denis Poisson. Thus, the school had become renowned for its mathematical instruction.

After graduating in 1814, Sadi went to study in École du Génie at Metz to study the two year course in military engineering. Sadi then became an officer in the French army's corps of engineers.  His father Lazare had served as Napoleon's minister of the interior during the "Hundred Days", and, after Napoleon's final defeat in 1815, Lazare was forced into exile.  Sadi's position in the army, under the restored Bourbon monarchy of Louis XVIII, became increasingly difficult.

Sadi Carnot was posted to different locations, where he inspected fortifications, tracked plans, and wrote many reports. It appeared that his recommendations were ignored and his career was stagnating. On 15 September 1818 he took a six-month leave to prepare for the entrance examination of Royal Corps of Staff and School of Application for the Service of the General Staff.

In 1819, Sadi transferred to the newly formed General Staff in Paris.  He remained on call for military duty, but from then on he dedicated most of his attention to private intellectual pursuits and received only two-thirds pay. Carnot befriended Nicolas Clément and Charles-Bernard Desormes and attended lectures on physics and chemistry.  He became interested in understanding the limitation to improving the performance of steam engines, which led him to the investigations that became his Reflections on the Motive Power of Fire, published in 1824.

Carnot retired from the army in 1828, without a pension.  He was interned in a private asylum in 1832 as suffering from "mania" and "general delirum", and he died of cholera shortly thereafter, aged 36, at the hospital in Ivry-sur-Seine.

Reflections on the Motive Power of Fire

Background
When Carnot began working on his book, steam engines had achieved widely recognized economic and industrial importance, but there had been no real scientific study of them. Newcomen had invented the first piston-operated steam engine over a century before, in 1712; some 50 years after that, James Watt made his celebrated improvements, which were responsible for greatly increasing the efficiency and practicality of steam engines. Compound engines (engines with more than one stage of expansion) had already been invented, and there was even a crude form of internal-combustion engine, with which Carnot was familiar and which he described in some detail in his book. Although there existed some intuitive understanding of the workings of engines, scientific theory for their operation was almost nonexistent. In 1824 the principle of conservation of energy was still poorly developed and controversial, and an exact formulation of the first law of thermodynamics was still more than a decade away; the mechanical equivalence of heat would not be formulated for another two decades. The prevalent theory of heat was the caloric theory, which regarded heat as a sort of weightless and invisible fluid that flowed when out of equilibrium.

Engineers in Carnot's time had tried, by means such as highly pressurized steam and the use of fluids, to improve the efficiency of engines. In these early stages of engine development, the efficiency of a typical engine—the useful work it was able to do when a given quantity of fuel was burned—was only 3%.

Carnot cycle

Carnot wanted to answer two questions about the operation of heat engines: "Is the work available from a heat source potentially unbounded?" and  "Can heat engines in principle be improved by replacing the steam with some other working fluid or gas?"  He attempted to answer these in a memoir, published as a popular work in 1824 when he was only 27 years old.  It was entitled Réflexions sur la Puissance Motrice du Feu ("Reflections on the Motive Power of Fire"). The book was plainly intended to cover a rather wide range of topics about heat engines in a rather popular fashion; equations were kept to a minimum and called for little more than simple algebra and arithmetic, except occasionally in the footnotes, where he indulged in a few arguments involving some calculus. He discussed the relative merits of air and steam as working fluids, the merits of various aspects of steam engine design, and even included some ideas of his own regarding possible practical improvements. The most important part of the book was devoted to an abstract presentation of an idealized engine that could be used to understand and clarify the fundamental principles that are generally applied to all heat engines, independent of their design.

Perhaps the most important contribution Carnot made to thermodynamics was his abstraction of the essential features of the steam engine, as they were known in his day, into a more general and idealized heat engine.  This resulted in a model thermodynamic system upon which exact calculations could be made, and avoided the complications introduced by many of the crude features of the contemporary steam engine. By idealizing the engine, he could arrive at clear and indisputable answers to his original two questions.

He showed that the efficiency of this idealized engine is a function only of the two temperatures of the reservoirs between which it operates. He did not, however, give the exact form of the function, which was later shown to be (T1−T2)/T1, where T1 is the absolute temperature of the hotter reservoir. (Note: This equation probably came from Kelvin.) No thermal engine operating any other cycle can be more efficient, given the same operating temperatures.

The Carnot cycle is the most efficient possible engine, not only because of the (trivial) absence of friction and other incidental wasteful processes; the main reason is that it assumes no conduction of heat between parts of the engine at different temperatures. Carnot knew that the conduction of heat between bodies at different temperatures is a wasteful and irreversible process, which must be eliminated if the heat engine is to achieve maximum efficiency.

Regarding the second point, he also was quite certain that the maximum efficiency attainable did not depend upon the exact nature of the working fluid.  He stated this for emphasis as a general proposition:

For his "motive power of heat", we would today say "the efficiency of a reversible heat engine", and rather than "transfer of caloric" we would say "the reversible transfer of entropy ∆S" or "the reversible transfer of heat at a given temperature Q/T".  He knew intuitively that his engine would have the maximum efficiency, but was unable to state what that efficiency would be.

He concluded:

and

In an idealized model, the caloric transported from a hot to a cold body by a frictionless heat engine that lacks of conductive heat flow, driven by a difference of temperature, yielding work, could also be used to transport the caloric back to the hot body by reversing the motion of the engine consuming the same amount of work, a concept subsequently known as thermodynamic reversibility. Carnot further postulated that no caloric is lost during the operation of his idealized engine. The process being completely reversible, executed by this kind of heat engine is the most efficient possible process. The assumption that heat conduction driven by a temperature difference cannot exist, so that no caloric is lost by the engine, guided him to design the Carnot-cycle to be operated by his idealized engine. The cycle is consequently composed of adiabatic processes where no heat/caloric ∆S = 0 flows and isothermal processes where heat is transferred ∆S > 0 but no temperature difference ∆T = 0 exist. The proof of the existence of a maximum efficiency for heat engines is as follows:

As the cycle named after him doesn't waste caloric, the reversible engine has to use this cycle. Imagine now two large bodies, a hot and a cold one. He postulates now the existence of a heat machine with a greater efficiency. We couple now two idealized machine but of different efficiencies and connect them to the same hot and the same cold body. The first and less efficient one lets a constant amount of entropy ∆S = Q/T flow from hot to cold during each cycle, yielding an amount of work denoted W. If we use now this work to power the other more efficient machine, it would, using the amount of work W gained during each cycle by the first machine, make an amount of entropy ∆S' > ∆S flow from the cold to the hot body. The net effect is a flow of ∆S' − ∆S ≠ 0 of entropy from the cold to the hot body, while no net work is done. Consequently, the cold body is cooled down and the hot body rises in temperature. As the difference of temperature rises now the yielding of work by the first is greater in the successive cycles and due to the second engine difference in temperature of the two bodies stretches by each cycle even more. In the end this set of machines would be a perpetuum mobile that cannot exist. This proves that the assumption of the existence of a more efficient engine was wrong so that a heat engine that operates the Carnot cycle must be the most efficient one. This means that a frictionless heat engine that lacks of conductive heat flow driven by a difference of temperature shows maximum possible efficiency.

He concludes further that the choice of the working fluid, its density or the volume occupied by it cannot change this maximum efficiency. Using the equivalence of any working gas used in heat engines he deduced that the difference in the specific heat of a gas measured at constant pressure and at constant volume must be constant for all gases.
By comparing the operation of his hypothetical heat engines for two different volumes occupied by the same amount of working gas he correctly deduces the relation between entropy and volume for an isothermal process:

Reception and later life
Carnot's book received very little attention from his contemporaries. The only reference to it within a few years after its publication was in a review in the periodical Revue Encyclopédique, which was a journal that covered a wide range of topics in literature. The impact of the work had only become apparent once it was modernized by Émile Clapeyron in 1834 and then further elaborated upon by Clausius and Kelvin, who together derived from it the concept of entropy and the second law of thermodynamics. Rankine, who introduced the term potential energy in 1853, was later made aware that an equivalent phrase, "in its purely mechanical sense, had been anticipated by Carnot", who had employed the term force vive virtuelle.

On Carnot's religious views, he was a Philosophical theist. He believed in divine causality, stating that "what to an ignorant man is chance, cannot be chance to one better instructed," but he did not believe in divine punishment. He criticized established religion, though at the same time spoke in favor of "the belief in an all-powerful Being, who loves us and watches over us."

He was a reader of Blaise Pascal, Molière and Jean de La Fontaine.

Death
Carnot died during a cholera epidemic in 1832, at the age of 36.  
Because of the contagious nature of cholera, many of Carnot's belongings and writings were buried together with him after his death. As a consequence, only a handful of his scientific writings survived.

After the publication of Reflections on the Motive Power of Fire, the book quickly went out of print and for some time was very difficult to obtain. Kelvin, for one, had a difficult time getting a copy of Carnot's book. In 1890 an English translation of the book was published by R. H. Thurston; this version has been reprinted in recent decades by Dover and by Peter Smith, most recently by Dover in 2005. Some of Carnot's posthumous manuscripts have also been translated into English.

Carnot published his book in the heyday of steam engines. His theory explained why steam engines using superheated steam were better because of the higher temperature of the consequent hot reservoir. Carnot's theories and efforts did not immediately help improve the efficiency of steam engines; his theories only helped to explain why one existing practice was superior to others. It was only towards the end of the nineteenth century that Carnot's ideas, namely that a heat engine can be made more efficient if the temperature of its hot reservoir is increased, were put into practice. Carnot's book did, however, eventually have a real impact on the design of practical engines. Rudolf Diesel, for example, used Carnot's theories to design the diesel engine, in which the temperature of the hot reservoir is much higher than that of a steam engine, resulting in an engine which is more efficient.

Works 
 Reflections on the Motive Power of Fire (1824)

See also
 History of the internal combustion engine

References

Bibliography 
 
 
 
 
 
  
 (full text of 1897 ed.)

External links 

 
 
 Reflections on the Motive Power of Heat (1890), English translation by R. H. Thurston (at Internet Archive)
 Sadi Carnot and the Second Law of Thermodynamics, J. Srinivasan, Resonance, November 2001, 42 (PDF file)
 Reflections on the Motive Power of Heat (1824), analysed on BibNum (click "À télécharger" for English analysis)

1796 births
1832 deaths
19th-century French mathematicians
19th-century French physicists
French deists
École Polytechnique alumni
French military engineers
Thermodynamicists
Deaths from cholera
Infectious disease deaths in France
Engineers from Paris
Fluid dynamicists
Carnot family
Conservatoire national des arts et métiers alumni